Antonio Maura Montaner (2 May 1853 – 13 December 1925) was Prime Minister of Spain on five separate occasions.

Early life 
Maura was born in Palma, on the island of Mallorca, and studied law in Madrid. In 1878, Maura married Constancia Gamazo y Calvo, the sister of Germán Gamazo. They had several sons and a daughter together, many of whom have been prominent in Spanish and European history.

Political career 
He entered the Cortes Generales in 1881 as a Liberal delegate for Majorca but later joined the Conservative Party. In 1886, Maura was elected vice president of the Congress of Deputies. 

As prime minister, he created the Spanish Institute of Provision and attempted to carry out a reform plan, but it was opposed by the liberals. He fell from power after his suppression of an uprising in Barcelona in 1909, called the Tragic Week. The execution of Francisco Ferrer, who was charged with leading the uprising, provoked a European-wide outcry that contributed to Maura's downfall.

Maura was a hero of a youth movement, the Mauristas, that wanted him as a new head of state of Spain at a time of substantial resentment of King Alfonso XIII. That and Maura's ambition caused him to fall out with the King. Maura later headed coalition cabinets with other parties (1918, 1919, 1921–22) but did nothing to advance unconstitutional methods. Many of his followers later supported the dictatorship of Miguel Primo de Rivera, but he remained aloof from both Primo de Rivera and the King. Maura had first entered the political arena to fight the caciquismo culture, which he considered a cancer of Spanish political culture and the main obstacle to authentically-democratic institutions.

When he was prime minister, he spent summers at the estate of Can Mossenya, historically part of the Valldemossa Charterhouse in Mallorca, and Chopin and George Sand had stayed there in the previous century. Azorín traveled from the continent to meet Maura there. Maura became a prolific watercolourist who often painted scenes of nature or old buildings from past eras.

He died in Torrelodones, a small town in the Guadarrama mountains, north-west of Madrid, in 1925. The International Foundation Can Mossenya named an entrance to its historic estate, the "Gate of Friendship – Azorín and Maura", after the men's encounter.

Descendants
 Gabriel Maura y Gamazo (son) – historian and Minister of Labour
 Honorio Maura y Gamazo – playwright and monarchist deputy, killed by leftist militia in 1936
 Miguel Maura y Gamazo (son) – Minister of Security
 Susana Maura y Gamazo (mother of Jorge and Carlos Semprún)
 Constancia de la Mora Maura (granddaughter) – writer, Foreign Press Officer (Spanish Republic)
 Jorge Semprún y Maura (grandson) – writer, communist and Minister of Culture
 Carlos Semprún y Maura grandson) – writer and journalist
 Jaime Semprún (great-grandson) – writer
 Ricardo Semprún (great-grandson) – diplomat
 Pablo Semprún (great-grandson) – professional paddle tennis player
 Luisa Isabel Álvarez de Toledo (great-granddaughter)
 Jaime Chávarri y de la Mora (great-grandson) – film director.

See also
 Monument to Antonio Maura

References

External links

 International Foundation Can Mossenya – Friends of Jorge Luis Borges
 

1853 births
1925 deaths
People from Palma de Mallorca
Prime Ministers of Spain
Members of the Royal Spanish Academy
Conservative Party (Spain) politicians
Justice ministers of Spain
Leaders of political parties in Spain
Interior ministers of Spain
Overseas ministers of Spain
Knights of the Golden Fleece of Spain
Honorary Knights Grand Cross of the Royal Victorian Order